Mark Lawson (born 31 May 1962) is a former Australian rules footballer who played with Collingwood in the Victorian Football League (VFL).

Lawson, a North Reservoir recruit, made his debut for Collingwood in round 17 of the 1982 VFL season and remained in the team for the rest of the year. He played four games in 1983, then just one in 1984. After a stint with Port Adelaide, Lawson returned to Melbourne and played with Preston.

References

1962 births
Australian rules footballers from Victoria (Australia)
Collingwood Football Club players
Port Adelaide Football Club (SANFL) players
Port Adelaide Football Club players (all competitions)
Preston Football Club (VFA) players
Living people